Arctia olschwangi is a moth of the family Erebidae. It was described by Vladimir Viktorovitch Dubatolov in 1990. It is found in the polar Ural, Yamal Peninsula, Yakutia, Lena River delta.

References

 , 1990: New taxa of tiger moths (Lepidoptera, Arctiidae: Arctiinae) from the Palearctic. 2nd report. In: Taxonomy of insects and helminths: 89-101, Nauka, Siberian Department: Novosibirsk. (Series "New and little known species of Siberian fauna", No. 22) (in Russian).
 , 2011: Lymantriinae and Arctiinae - Including Phylogeny and Check List of the Quadrifid Noctuoidea of Europe. Noctuidae Europaeae Volume 13: 1-448.

Moths described in 1990
Arctiina
Moths of Asia